The Administrative Appeals Tribunal (AAT) is an Australian tribunal that conducts independent merits review of administrative decisions made under Commonwealth laws of the Australian Government. The AAT review decisions made by Australian Government ministers, departments and agencies, and in limited circumstances, decisions made by state government and non-government bodies. They also review decisions made under Norfolk Island laws. It is not a court and not part of the Australian court hierarchy; however, its decisions are subject to review by the Federal Court of Australia and the Federal Circuit Court of Australia. The AAT was established by the Administrative Appeals Tribunal Act 1975 and started operation in 1976.

On 1 July 2015, the Migration Review Tribunal, Refugee Review Tribunal and Social Security Appeals Tribunal became divisions of the Administrative Appeals Tribunal.

In December 2022, Attorney-General Mark Dreyfus announced that the AAT will be abolished and replaced with a new body.

Origins
The AAT was established by the Administrative Appeals Tribunal Act 1975 and commenced operations on 1 July 1976.

On 1 July 2015, the Migration Review Tribunal, Refugee Review Tribunal and Social Security Appeals Tribunal were amalgamated with the AAT.

Organisation 
The AAT manages their workload in the following divisions:
 Freedom of Information Division (FOI Division)
 General Division
 Migration and Refugee Division 
 National Disability Insurance Scheme Division (NDIS Division)
 Security Division 
 Small Business Taxation Division
 Social Services and Child Support Division
 Taxation and Commercial Division, and 
 Veterans' Appeals Division.

Jurisdiction

The AAT does not have a general jurisdiction to review administrative decisions. Rather the individual statutes that empower agencies or ministers to make decisions also grant jurisdiction to the AAT to review the decisions. For example, certain decisions made by a delegate of the Minister for Immigration and Citizenship under the Migration Act 1958 may be subject to merits review in the AAT. The right of review is provided for in the Migration Act itself.

The Tribunal is not a court. The High Court has long held that the Australian Constitution, mandates a separation of powers between the executive, legislative and judicial branches of government. Judicial review of administrative decisions takes place in courts, such as the Federal Court and the Federal Circuit Court. The AAT remains part of the executive branch of government.

The AAT has jurisdiction to review a number of decisions made under Commonwealth legislation, including in the areas of taxation, immigration, social security, industrial law, corporations and bankruptcy. These decisions may have been made by officials including government ministers, departments, public servants with delegated authority and statutory government bodies. The authority to review administrative decisions is limited to specific areas of government administration where an Act, regulation or other legislative instrument provides for a review by the AAT. The Tribunal has no power to enquire into government decisions generally. More than 400 federal Acts provide for review by the AAT. The Tribunal also has powers to review the decisions of some other Australian tribunals, such as the Veterans' Review Board. The Tribunal has no power to consider the constitutional validity of particular laws or the legality of government decision-making, but only whether decisions made by government officials was made in accordance with the relevant statutory requirements.

The AAT's review of government decisions is merit based: it considers whether, on the facts presented to the Tribunal, the correct or preferable decision was made in respect of the applicable law(s) and government procedures. Hearings are conducted de novo and the AAT is not restricted to the material before the original decision maker in making its decision if new evidence has arisen after the original decision was made. Section 43(1) of the Administrative Appeals Tribunal Act states that the AAT may exercise all the powers and discretions of the original decision maker. It can 'stand in the shoes of the original decision maker' and reconsider the decision using whatever information is brought before it or available to it.

Structure

The Administrative Appeals Tribunal (AAT) consists of the President and the other members who may be appointed as:
 Deputy Presidents
 Senior Members, or
 Members. 
The President is responsible for the overall management of the Tribunal with the assistance of Division Heads and the Registrar. Staff are employed under the Public Service Act 1999 to assist the AAT to carry out its functions.

The President of the AAT must be a judge of the Federal Court of Australia. The AAT's other members may be:
 judges of the Federal Court or Family Court of Australia (part-time Deputy Presidents)
 lawyers of at least five years' standing, or
 persons of relevant knowledge or skills.

The position of President is currently vacant; Justice Berna Collier is acting in that role following the resignation of Justice Fiona Meagher (who previously served as Deputy President and head of the National Disability Insurance Scheme Division). Although the President of the AAT must be a judge of the Federal Court, they serve on the AAT in a personal, not judicial, capacity.

Members of the Tribunal come from a range of backgrounds and include persons with expertise in accountancy, aviation, engineering, environmental science, law, medicine, pharmacology, military affairs, public administration and taxation. Members of the AAT are appointed by the Governor-General on a full-time or part-time basis. Appointments may be made for a term of up to seven years. Members may be reappointed.

Members of the Tribunal who are legally qualified and have 5 years' standing, where authorised to do so, may exercise powers under a number of other Acts. This includes the power to issue telecommunications interception warrants and stored communications warrants under the Telecommunications (Interception and Access) Act 1979, issue warrants and exercise related powers under the Surveillance Devices Act 2004 and review certificates that authorise controlled operations under the Crimes Act 1914. Presidential Members and Senior Members who are legally qualified and have 5 years' standing, may be appointed as an approved examiners under the Proceeds of Crime Act 2002 The President and Deputy Presidents may be appointed as issuing authorities in relation to the making of continued preventative detention orders under the Criminal Code.

See also

Judiciary of Australia
List of Commonwealth courts and tribunals
Fraser Government

References

External links
Administrative Appeals Tribunal
Administrative Appeals Tribunal Act 1975 (Cth) in Federal Register of Legislation

Government of Australia
Australian tribunals
1976 establishments in Australia
Courts and tribunals established in 1976